Jonah Ranaivo (17 January 1908 - 18 April 1988) was a French Malagasy politician who represented French Madagascar in the National Assembly of France from 1951 to 1955.

Biography 
Ranaivo was born on 17 January 1908 in Vatomandry, French Madagascar. He served in the French National Assembly from 1951 to 1955 during the French Fourth Republic. Ranaivo died on 18 April 1988 in Aulnay-sous-Bois, France

References 
page on the French National Assembly website

1908 births
1988 deaths
People from Atsinanana
Malagasy politicians
Deputies of the 2nd National Assembly of the French Fourth Republic
Malagasy emigrants to France